Papa Noel Nedule is a soukous recording artist and guitarist in the Democratic Republic of the Congo (DRC). 

He was born as Antoine Nedule Monswet on December 25, 1940.  Because of his Christmas birthdate, he became known as "Papa Noel," and he is often referred to under that name (without "Nedule").

He was once a member of the soukous band TPOK Jazz, led by François Luambo Makiadi, which dominated the Congolese music scene from the 1950s through the 1980s.

He was an original member and leader of the band Kékélé when it was founded in 2000, although illness prevented him from joining the band in some of its later recording sessions and tours.

Discography
 Cafe Noir (2007)
Contributing artist
 The Rough Guide to Congo Gold (2008, World Music Network)

See also

 Josky Kiambukuta
 Simaro Lutumba
 Youlou Mabiala
 Sam Mangwana
 Wuta Mayi
 Ndombe Opetum
 Mose Se Sengo - "Fan Fan"
 List of African musicians

References

External links
 Overview of Composition of TPOK Jazz
 Compilation of stories about Papa Noel, mostly reviews of Cafe Noir
 December 2009 bio by Clément Ossinode (in French)
 2017 article by Samuel Malonga on his Orchestre Bamboula (in French), with useful comments

Democratic Republic of the Congo musicians
TPOK Jazz members
1940 births
Living people
Place of birth missing (living people)